Rodolfo Pérez (born 6 January 1945) is an Argentine judoka. He competed in the men's middleweight event at the 1964 Summer Olympics.

References

1945 births
Living people
Argentine male judoka
Olympic judoka of Argentina
Judoka at the 1964 Summer Olympics
Place of birth missing (living people)
Pan American Games medalists in judo
Pan American Games silver medalists for Argentina
Judoka at the 1967 Pan American Games
Medalists at the 1967 Pan American Games